Limpet Mill was a railway station in Kincardineshire, Scotland from 1849 to 1850 on the Aberdeen Railway.

History 
This station was opened on 1 November 1849 by the Aberdeen Railway. It was a temporary terminus, with coach connections to Portlethen and Aberdeen. It operated for five months, as the railway was extended and a new terminus, Aberdeen Ferryhill railway station, was opened on 1 April 1850.

References

External links 
Limpet Mill on Railscot

Former Caledonian Railway stations
Railway stations in Great Britain opened in 1849
Railway stations in Great Britain closed in 1850
1849 establishments in Scotland